is a private women's junior college in Ueda, Nagano, Japan, established in 1967.

External links
 Official website 

Educational institutions established in 1967
Private universities and colleges in Japan
Universities and colleges in Nagano Prefecture
Japanese junior colleges
1967 establishments in Japan
Women's universities and colleges in Japan
Ueda, Nagano